Akçiçek can refer to:

 Akçiçek, Alaca
 Akçiçek, Karakoçan
 the Turkish name for Sysklipos